Coregonus gutturosus, the Lake Constance whitefish, is an extinct species of whitefish in the salmon family Salmonidae. It was formerly found only in deep areas of Lake Constance in the Alps.

Extinction
Coregonus gutturosus was highly sensitive to environmental changes and it is thought that the eutrophication of Lake Constance, which peaked in 1979, irreversibly affected the development of the eggs of the species.

Surveys undertaken at the start of the 21st century failed to find any evidence of the survival of the Lake Constance whitefish.

References

gutturosus
Fish described in 1818
Freshwater fish of Europe
Lake Constance
Cold water fish
Extinct animals of Europe
Fish extinctions since 1500